A protonema (plural: protonemata) is a thread-like chain of cells that forms the earliest stage of development of the gametophyte (the haploid phase) in the life cycle of mosses. When a moss first grows from a spore, it starts as a germ tube, which lengthens and branches into a filamentous complex known as a protonema, which develops into a leafy gametophore, the adult form of a gametophyte in bryophytes.

Moss spores germinate to form an alga-like filamentous structure called the protonema. It represents the juvenile gametophyte. While the protonema is growing by apical cell division, at some stage, under the influence of the phytohormone cytokinin, buds are induced which grow by three-faced apical cells. These give rise to gametophores, stems and leaf like structures. Bryophytes do not have true leaves (megaphylls).  Protonemata are characteristic of all mosses and some liverworts but are absent from hornworts.

Protonemata of mosses are composed of two cell types: chloronemata, which form upon germination, and caulonemata, which later differentiate from chloronemata and on which buds are formed, which then differentiate to gametophores.

References

Bryophytes
Plant morphology